Bernay may refer to:

People 
Alexandre de Bernay, 12th-century Norman poet
Beryl Bernay (1926–2020), American children's television presenter
Eric Bernay (1906–1968), American record producer, founder of Keynote Records

Places in France

Communes 
Bernay, Eure
Bernay-en-Champagne, Sarthe
Bernay-en-Ponthieu, Somme
Bernay-Saint-Martin, Charente-Maritime
Bernay-Vilbert, Seine-et-Marne

Other places 

Arrondissement of Bernay, Eure
Canton of Bernay, Eure

Transport 
Bernay station, serving Bernay, Eure, France

See also 
Bernays